ACC Womens T20 Emerging Teams Asia Cup is a womens List-A cricket tournament. It was created by the Asian Cricket Council (ACC) to develop the talents of the most prominent females young cricketers of full members and associate nations in Asia.

Results

Tournaments summary

References

Women's Twenty20 cricket international competitions
 Cricket in Asia